Sir Michael Roberts Westropp (29 June 1817 – 14 January 1890) was the Chief Justice of the Bombay High Court and former Advocate General of the Supreme Court, Bombay Presidency.

Early life
Westropp was born in 1817 in Ireland. He was the son of Henry Bruen Westropp and Maria Wallis Armstrong. In 1838 he graduated from Trinity College, Dublin, Dublin University and became Barrister-at-Law in 1840.

Career
He practiced law for more than 15 years in Dublin and then joined as a Counsel in the Bombay Supreme Court and the Bombay High Court. He was awarded Knight Commander of the Order of the Indian Empire and also served as Member of the Bombay Legislative Council in 1862-63. In 1856, Westropp became the Advocate-General of Bombay. After Sir Richard Couch he held the office of Chief Justice of Bombay in 1870. He was known for the judgments in Nawroji v. Rogers and Lopes v. Lopes cases. Westropp retired from service due to illness.

References

1817 births
1890 deaths
19th-century English judges
Alumni of Trinity College Dublin
British India judges
Chief Justices of the Bombay High Court
Knights Commander of the Order of the Indian Empire
Members of the Bombay Legislative Council